Asemum is a genus of longhorn beetles in the family Cerambycidae, described by  Johann Friedrich von Eschscholtz in 1830.

Species
 Asemum australe  LeConte, 1850
 Asemum caseyi  Linsley, 1957
 Asemum glabrellum  Bates, 1892
 Asemum lucidulum  Pesarini & Sabbadini, 1997
 Asemum nitidum  LeConte, 1873
 Asemum punctulatum  Blessig, 1872
 Asemum striatum  (Linnaeus, 1758)- Black Spruce Borer 
 Asemum tenuicorne  Kraatz, 1879

References
 Biolib

Spondylidinae
Beetles of North America
Beetles described in 1830
Taxa named by Johann Friedrich von Eschscholtz
Cerambycidae genera